Livingston Allen (born May 17, 1991), more commonly known as DJ Akademiks or simply Akademiks, is a Jamaican-American podcaster, media personality and YouTuber. DJ Akademiks rose to fame for his YouTube channel which covers the latest news in the hip hop music genre, and also for being a co-host of Everyday Struggle, a daily show by Complex Networks. He also hosts Off the Record with DJ Akademiks on Spotify.

Early life 
DJ Akademiks was born on May 17, 1991, in Spanish Town, Jamaica. He has one brother. His father was a school principal and is stated to have had many extra-marital affairs due to his affluent status in Jamaican society. DJ Akademiks did not appreciate his father's character of being away from his family, engaging in extra-marital affairs, and eventually starting another family but he claims to have understood and forgiven him as he grew older. As a result, DJ Akademiks mainly grew up under the care of his mother and his grandmother. 

Akademiks' mother left him and his brother back in Jamaica and migrated to the United States of America. She worked many jobs, lived in sub-par conditions, and eventually paid an American man $20,000 USD to marry her so she could legally become a US citizen as quickly as possible. In 2001, DJ Akademiks and his brother were invited over to the US by their mother.

Education 
DJ Akademiks has a bachelor's degree in biomathematics from Rutgers University (New Brunswick Campus). He was a disc jockey for the Rutgers University radio station WRSU-FM until 2013, when he was kicked out for his commentary and selection of music. As evident from a Crime Alert flyer issued by the Rutgers University Campus Police in June 2011, DJ Akademiks and another accomplice were wanted for stealing computers from fellow students on campus.

Career

Early career 
DJ Akademiks was a regular on online hip-hop forums. His first YouTube channel titled DJ Akademiks created in October 2012 initially highlighted his university disc jockey sessions, interviews, and Hip-Hop/Rap opinions. Over time, he began posting the latest breaking news in the Hip-Hop/Rap genre. During this time, he operated a website titled Late Night Creep, which centred around Hip-Hop/Rap news but it is currently not operational.

2014 
In May 2014, DJ Akademiks created a YouTube channel titled Crime Fails, which highlighted the mishaps committed by criminals during or after their criminal deeds.

In June 2014, DJ Akademiks created a YouTube channel titled The War in Chiraq, which mainly centred around the coverage of the gang conflicts in Chicago and the various drill artists encompassing these conflicts.

2015 
In February 2015, DJ Akademiks created a YouTube channel titled King Akademiks, where he solely posted highlight clips from his latest Twitch livestreams and began live streaming on in 2022. 

In March 2015, DJ Akademiks created a YouTube channel titled Akademiks TV, where he posted noteworthy footage obtained from various musicians in the Hip-Hop/Rap genre. This footage did not feature any of DJ Akademiks' commentary. 

In July 2015, DJ Akademiks uploaded a video to his first self-titled YouTube channel, stating that his channel had been suspended and that he was moving to a new channel, also titled DJ Akademiks where he continued posting Hip-Hop/Rap related news. 

In August 2015, DJ Akademiks created a YouTube channel titled DJ Akademiks TV2 – The Negrotiator, which served as a backup for his newly created and now main channel DJ Akademiks, posting the same type of content but with a more critical and opinion-based touch.

2017–2020
Aside from regularly posting and growing his DJ Akademiks YouTube channel, Instagram account, and Twitter account, from April 2017, to December 2020, DJ Akademiks co-hosted Everyday Struggle, a daily morning show for Complex, with Joe Budden (eventually replaced by Star, and finally Wayno) and Nadeska Alexis. 

In April 2018, DJ Akademiks launched his rapper alter-ego Lil Ak, by posting a music video for his song "Blues Clues", which included a cameo from rapper 6ix9ine. The music video amassed 3.1 million views. DJ Akademiks created a separate YouTube channel for his rapper alter-ego, titled Lil AK. He continued to release a string of songs and music videos up until September 2020.

2021–present 
In August 2021, DJ Akademiks launched his podcast, Off the Record with DJ Akademiks, in partnership with Spotify. It releases three episodes per week that centre around roundtable discussions, and interviews with various Hip-Hop/Rap musicians and media personalities.

Controversies
On the BET Awards pre-show on June 25, 2017, DJ Akademiks and his co-hosts interviewed Atlanta rap group Migos, where tensions rose between him, his co-host Joe Budden and late Migos member Takeoff, after he questioned his absence on Migos' 2016 hit single "Bad and Boujee". 

In September 2018, DJ Akademiks was mentioned in the Eminem song 'Fall' where he raps about Joe Budden and DJ Akademiks negatively reviewing Eminem's Revival album, "Somebody tell Budden before I snap, he better fasten it. Or have his body bag get zipped. The closest thing he’s had to hits is smackin' bitches. And don't make me have to give it back to Akademiks. Say this shit is trash again, I’ll have you twisted." DJ Akademiks responded with, "I thought it was only Joe getting dissed, I got name dropped and dissed. And I’m like, ‘the fuck did I do?".

In July 2020, DJ Akademiks was suspended from Complex, for crudely insulting model Chrissy Teigen while live streaming.

In February 2022, DJ Akademiks confronted rapper Megan Thee Stallion on Twitter, claiming her allegation that she'd been shot by rapper Tory Lanez was not supported by DNA evidence. In May 2022, DJ Akademiks used an outdated social media post of an LAPD police report, from before bullet fragments were discovered in Megan Thee Stallion's feet during surgery, alongside false claims that the singer had not been shot at all. In December 2022, Lanez was convicted of the shooting. 

In June 2022, DJ Akademiks found himself being labelled a pedophile, after a minor segment from a video of his from 2014 resurfaced where he states, "And to keep it real, if you think about it in the bigger scheme of things, there's not much difference between a 20 or a 17 or a 21 and a 17, just kinda means one's a minor and one's not a minor. But listen, I will say I adopted this rule which I think is fine, I said listen, 'as long as a chick got a college ID she's getting fucked.' I don't care if she 17, I don't care if she 17 and a half, I don't care if she just turned 17, and I'm 21, she gon' get this dick." 

DJ Akademiks later took to his Twitch account and defended himself by saying that the short video was obtained from a video that was eight years old and that it was missing the context of him addressing the controversial relationship of Tyga and Kylie Jenner pertaining to their age differences. He stated that he had never slept with an underage person, and was only referring specifically to the college environment, where most freshmen are 18 or about to turn 18, "I was talking about being in an institution, college or high school, where the ages are a little bit out of what is actually acceptable. Four months of college years some people are 17, and when people go to college they do not check IDs. No one says 'Hey, how old are you?' I've been to college. They're usually under the assumption that the people they are dating are of age." 

In September 2022, podcast host and former rapper Joe Budden criticized DJ Akademiks for sharing a video clip of rapper PnB Rock, speaking about being a potential robbery target, several days after PnB Rock had been shot to death in a robbery attempt. That same month, DJ Akademiks was criticized by hip-hop pioneers LL Cool J, MC Lyte, Russell Simmons, and Spice 1 for calling older rappers "dusty". In September 2022, Chicago rapper Chief Keef disputed a claim that DJ Akademiks had created Keef's career and actress Toya Johnson disputed DJ Akademiks over his remarks on her daughter Reginae Carter. Atlanta rapper T.I. also criticized DJ Akademiks' remarks about Carter. 

In October 2022, a video of DJ Akademiks shouting at his girlfriend and separating her from a fight surfaced online. Rapper Freddie Gibbs responded to the situation by taunting him on Twitter. Also in October 2022, Atlanta rapper Lil Baby dissed him numerous times on his album It's Only Me. In response he expressed his disdain for Lil Baby and his music, and jokingly expressed his willingness to testify against the rapper should he ever get criminally charged.

References

1991 births
American bloggers
American DJs
American male bloggers
American podcasters
American YouTubers
Instagram accounts
Jamaican American
Jamaican emigrants to the United States
Living people
Music YouTubers
News YouTubers
People from New Jersey
Rutgers University alumni
Social media influencers
Twitch (service) streamers

YouTube controversies